John Udal may refer to:

 John Oliver Udal, district commissioner in Anglo-Egyptian Sudan
 John Udal (judge) (1848–1925), English-born cricketer, antiquarian, author, lawyer and judge

See also
John Udall (Puritan) (1560?–1592), English clergyman
John Hunt Udall (1889–1959), mayor of Phoenix, Arizona from 1936 to 1938
John Udell (1795–1874), American farmer and Baptist lay preacher